Aung Phyo Wai (born 3 May 1993) is a footballer from Burma, and current play as a goalkeeper for Nay Pyi Taw.

Honors

Club
Myanmar National League(1): 2013

References

1993 births
Living people
People from Ayeyarwady Region
Burmese footballers
Yangon United F.C. players
Association football goalkeepers
Southeast Asian Games silver medalists for Myanmar
Southeast Asian Games medalists in football
Competitors at the 2015 Southeast Asian Games